Czechy may refer to:

 Czechy, Środa Śląska County in Lower Silesian Voivodeship (south-west Poland)
 Czechy, Lower Silesian Voivodeship (south-west Poland)
 Czechy, Łódź Voivodeship (central Poland)
 Czechy, Lesser Poland Voivodeship (south Poland)
 Czechy, Greater Poland Voivodeship (west-central Poland)
 Czechy, Pomeranian Voivodeship (north Poland)
 Czechy, West Pomeranian Voivodeship (north-west Poland)

See also
 Čechy (disambiguation)
 Csehi
 Czech (disambiguation)
 Čech (disambiguation)